St. Mary's of the Mountain Church was an historic Roman Catholic church on New York State Route 23A in Hunter, Greene County, New York. The church was completed in 1839 and is a one-story, four by two bay, post and beam frame structure on a modern concrete foundation. It features a moderately pitched gable roof, narrow clapboard sheathing, two engaged corner towers, and a Romanesque style engaged entry / bell tower. Also on the property is the parish cemetery.

It was added to the National Register of Historic Places in 1999.

It was razed on 04/12/2017.

References

External links
 St. Mary's of the Mountain Cemetery and "The Founding of Saint Mary Of The Mountain"

Roman Catholic churches in New York (state)
Churches on the National Register of Historic Places in New York (state)
Roman Catholic churches completed in 1839
19th-century Roman Catholic church buildings in the United States
Churches in Greene County, New York
National Register of Historic Places in Greene County, New York